Ljubin is a village in the municipality of Saraj, North Macedonia.

Demographics
According to the 2021 census, the village had a total of 2.426 inhabitants. Ethnic groups in the village include:
Albanians  1.493
Bosniaks 859
Macedonians 4
Turks 5
Romani people 1
Others 64

References

External links

Villages in Saraj Municipality
Albanian communities in North Macedonia